Agonum cupreum is a species of ground beetle from the subfamily Platyninae. It was described by Dejean in 1828 and is found in Duluth, Minnesota and Canada.

References

External links
Agonum cupreum on Bug Guide

Beetles described in 1828
cupreum
Beetles of North America